The Bohr–Van Leeuwen theorem states that when statistical mechanics and classical mechanics are applied consistently, the thermal average of the magnetization is always zero. This makes magnetism in solids solely a quantum mechanical effect and means that classical physics cannot account for paramagnetism, diamagnetism and ferromagnetism. Inability of classical physics to explain triboelectricity also stems from the Bohr–Van Leeuwen theorem.

History 
What is today known as the Bohr–Van Leeuwen theorem was discovered by Niels Bohr in 1911 in his doctoral dissertation and was later rediscovered by Hendrika Johanna van Leeuwen in her doctoral thesis in 1919.  In 1932, J. H. Van Vleck formalized and expanded upon Bohr's initial theorem in a book he wrote on electric and magnetic susceptibilities.

The significance of this discovery is that classical physics does not allow for such things as paramagnetism, diamagnetism and ferromagnetism and thus quantum physics are needed to explain the magnetic events. This result, "perhaps the most deflationary publication of all time," may have contributed to Bohr's development of a quasi-classical theory of the hydrogen atom in 1913.

Proof

An intuitive proof
The Bohr–Van Leeuwen theorem applies to an isolated system that cannot rotate. If the isolated system is allowed to rotate in response to an externally applied magnetic field, then this theorem does not apply. If, in addition, there is only one state of thermal equilibrium in a given temperature and field, and the system is allowed time to return to equilibrium after a field is applied, then there will be no magnetization.

This energy is equal to the sum of the kinetic energy ( for a particle with mass  and speed ) and the potential energy.

The magnetic field does not contribute to the potential energy. The Lorentz force on a particle with charge  and velocity  is

Therefore, the energy does not depend on the magnetic field, so the distribution of motions does not depend on the magnetic field.

In zero field, there will be no net motion of charged particles because the system is not able to rotate. There will therefore be an average magnetic moment of zero. Since the distribution of motions does not depend on the magnetic field, the moment in thermal equilibrium remains zero in any magnetic field.

A more formal proof

So as to lower the complexity of the proof, a system with  electrons will be used.

This is appropriate, since most of the magnetism in a solid is carried by electrons, and the proof is easily generalized to more than one type of charged particle.

Each electron has a negative charge  and mass .

The above equation shows that the magnetic moment is a linear function of the velocity coordinates, so the total magnetic moment in a given direction must be a linear function of the form

Maxwell–Boltzmann statistics gives the probability that the nth particle has momentum  and coordinate  as

where  is the Hamiltonian, the total energy of the system.

The thermal average of any function  of these generalized coordinates is then

In the presence of a magnetic field,

For each particle the components of the momentum  and position  are related by the equations of Hamiltonian mechanics:

Therefore,

so the moment  is a linear function of the momenta .

The thermally averaged moment,

is the sum of terms proportional to integrals of the form

where  represents one of the momentum coordinates.

Therefore, .

Applications 
The Bohr–Van Leeuwen theorem is useful in several applications including plasma physics: "All these references base their discussion of the Bohr–Van Leeuwen theorem on Niels Bohr's physical model, in which perfectly reflecting walls are necessary to provide the currents that cancel the net contribution from the interior of an element of plasma, and result in zero net diamagnetism for the plasma element."

Diamagnetism of a purely classical nature occurs in plasmas but is a consequence of thermal disequilibrium, such as a gradient in plasma density. Electromechanics and electrical engineering also see practical benefit from the Bohr–Van Leeuwen theorem.

See also
List of plasma (physics) articles

References

External links
 The early 20th century: Relativity and quantum mechanics bring understanding at last

Classical mechanics
Electric and magnetic fields in matter
Physics theorems
Statistical mechanics
Articles containing proofs
Statistical mechanics theorems